The 2014-15 Ugandan Super League is the 48th season of the official Ugandan football championship, the top-level football league of Uganda. Vipers SC won the title, their first since 2004.

Vipers SC held off second placed SC Villa for the title. SC Villa had three matches overturned to 3–0 victories in their favour during the season, with Express SC and Entebbe SC both being judged to have fielded ineligible players in their matches against SC Villa. Vipers would also hold of SC Villa on penalties in the 2015 Super Cup in August.

Overview
The 2014-15 FUFA Super League was contested by 16 teams, including Lweza FC, Sadolin Paints FC and Rwenshama FC who were promoted from the Ugandan Big League at the end of the 2013-14 season.

Participants and locations

Some of the Kampala clubs may on occasions also play home matches at the Mandela National Stadium.

League standings

References

Ugandan Super League seasons
Uganda Super League
Super League